Collingham Bridge is a road bridge that spans the Collingham Beck, a tributary of the River Wharfe on Harewood Road in Collingham, West Yorkshire, England.

Bernard Hartley, the county surveyor for the West Riding of Yorkshire was probably responsible for building the road bridge over the beck in about 1790. The Grade II listed bridge has a single arch and rusticated stone parapets. 

The bridge gave its name to the village railway station, distinguishing it from a station in Nottinghamshire.

See also
Listed buildings in Collingham, West Yorkshire

References  

Bridges in West Yorkshire
Grade II listed buildings in West Yorkshire